Balloon Bomber is a fixed shooter arcade video game released by Taito in 1980. The player controls a ship at the bottom of the screen which shoots at balloon-carrying bombs overhead. If a falling bomb hits the bottom of the screen, it makes a crater which cannot be moved past, limiting mobility.

Legacy
The game was re-released in multiple compilations, including Taito Legends 2 for PlayStation 2, Taito Memories Pocket (Japan/Asia), and Taito Legends Power Up (Europe) for the PlayStation Portable.

External links 
 
 Balloon Bomber at Arcade History

1980 video games
Arcade video games
Arcade-only video games
Fixed shooters
Taito arcade games
Video games developed in Japan